Achille Locatelli (January 1, 1864 – June 20, 1948) was an Italian painter, mainly of landscapes, and writer of art biographies.

He was born in Almenno San Bartolomeo, Province of Bergamo. Among his works were Un paese del Bresciano, Pioggia, Crepuscolo, Diga sul Brembo, Una giornata d'inverno sul Brembo, Un effetto di sole and Antica rotonda di San Tommaso in Almenno. He was probably a relative of the culture writer, Giuseppe Locatelli (born 1856 in Bergamo), who was the father of the art critic Achille Locatelli Milesi (born 1883).

References

19th-century Italian painters
Italian male painters
20th-century Italian painters
20th-century Italian male artists
1864 births
1948 deaths
Painters from Bergamo
Italian landscape painters
19th-century Italian male artists